By the End of Tonight (often abbreviated to BTEOT) was an American instrumental rock band from Alvin, Texas. They were signed to notable post-rock label Temporary Residence Limited for their life as a band.

History
By the End of Tonight formed in 2003 by Stefan Mach, Josh Smith, James Templeton, and Jeff Wilson. In 2006 Brett Taylor replaced Josh in the guitar role.

They have toured with Anathallo, Tera Melos, Sleeping People, Buxton, O Pioneers, etc.

They were the only band ever to be signed by Temporary Residence Limited based only on a demo (in their case, ...In a Letter to the Sandbox)

Jeff Wilson left the band in early 2008. No replacement was ever found and the band announced through a Myspace bulletin in early 2009 after almost a year of inactivity that they had disbanded.

The band reunited in 2011 for one show on 3/5 at Fitzgerald's as well as a set at the Free Press Houston Summerfest 2011.

Band members

Current members
 Stefan Mach - electric guitar
 Brett Taylor - electric guitar
 James Templeton - bass guitar, percussion
 Jeff Wilson - drums

Former members
 Josh Smith - electric guitar, keyboards (2003–2006)
 Jordan Brady - drums,  (2008–2009)

Discography

Full-length releases
 2005: A Tribute to Tigers - Temporary Residence Limited (Re-released in 2008)
 2007: Complex Full of Phantoms (split album with Tera Melos) - Temporary Residence

EPs/demos
 2003: ...In a Letter to the Sandbox - self-produced demo
 2004: Fireworks on Ice EP  - Temporary Residence
 2007: "Sweet Junk" EP [split 7-inch with O Pioneers!]

Releases by individual members
Three-inch CDEPs were recorded by each band member and issued as a limited four-part series, all released in 2006 on Temporary Residence.

 Part one: The Gunslinger EP (Stefan Mach)
 Part two: My Mom Caught Me in My Room Beat Boxin''' (James Templeton)
 Part three: He's Home with Bones That Grow the Way They're Supposed To (Jeff Wilson)
 Part four: The Imaginary EP'' (Josh Smith)

Compilation appearances

Temporary Residence's "Thankful" compilation album includes the previously unreleased track "Ready? Aim. Fire!"

References
Pitchfork
[ Allmusic]
tinymixtapes,
Drowned in Sound 
Dusted.

External links
 By the End of Tonight - official website
 By the End of Tonight on MySpace
 Lisa's Sons

American post-rock groups
Musical groups established in 2003
People from Alvin, Texas
Temporary Residence Limited artists